was a Japanese football player and manager. He managed Japan national team.

Playing career
Yamada was born in Nihonmatsu on March 3, 1894. After graduating from Tokyo Aoyama Normal School, he played for Tokyo Shukyu-Dan while working as a teacher at primary school. The club won first Emperor's Cup in 1921. He played as right midfielder and captain.

Coaching career
In 1925, Yamada became manager for Japan national team for 1925 Far Eastern Championship Games in Manila. He managed 2 matches at this competition, but Japan lost in both matches (0-4, v Philippines and 0-2, v Republic of China).

After retirement
In 1926, Yamada became a football journalist for Asahi Shimbun. He also served as a director of Japan Football Association from 1924 to 1958.

On March 9, 1958, Yamada died of intracranial hemorrhage in Ota, Tokyo at the age of 64. In 2005, he was selected Japan Football Hall of Fame.

References

External links
Japan Football Hall of Fame at Japan Football Association

1894 births
1958 deaths
Tokyo Gakugei University alumni
Association football people from Fukushima Prefecture
Japanese footballers
Japanese football managers
Japan national football team managers
Association football midfielders
Deaths from intracranial haemorrhage